Franky Knight is Émilie Simon's fifth studio album, released in December 2011.

Background
When David Foenkinos asked Émilie to write the soundtrack for La Délicatesse she already had some songs in mind for her next album that were very personal and she felt they were a perfect fit for the story.

Franky Knight makes reference to her fiancé and music partner, François Chevallier, who died of complications with Influenza A (H1N1) while on vacation in Athens, Greece. He also worked as sound engineer and producer with Coldplay, Arcade Fire and others.

Track listing

Singles

It was directed by David and Stéphane Foenkinos.

Charts

References

External links 
 

Émilie Simon albums
2011 albums